PS Orwell was a passenger vessel built for the Great Eastern Railway in 1873. The vessel was a paddle steamer.

History

The ship was built by Lewis and Stockwell in London in 1873. She was placed in excursion service on the River Orwell, between Ipswich and Harwich.

The force of the impact was so great that the bow of the Orwell stoved in, leaving a large hole which resulted in water pouring into the vessel. One of the paddle boxes was carried away. Captain Coe ran the Orwell ashore, and the passengers were transferred to the Stour.

Probably as a result of the damage sustained, she was sold for scrapping later that year.

References

1873 ships
Steamships of the United Kingdom
Paddle steamers of the United Kingdom
Ships built on the River Thames
Ships of the Great Eastern Railway